Next Great Baker: Latin America (also known as El desafío de Buddy: Latinoamérica) is a Latin American television series that airs on Discovery Home & Health: Latin America, hosted by Buddy Valastro, the star of his own reality series, Cake Boss. The show features contestants participating in challenges that test their baking and decorating skills. Each week, a contestant is eliminated; the last contestant standing will win a grand prize package that varies by season. Other prizes for winning a challenge or the week's competition are also offered during the series.

Countries Progress
 Argentina - Winner - Episode 6
 Colombia - Runner-Up - Episode 6
 Mexico - Third - Episode 5

Celebs

Contestant Eliminated

Contestant Progress

 (WINNER) This baker won the competition.
 (RUNNER-UP) This baker was the runner-up of the competition.
 (THIRD) This baker place third overall in the competition.
 (WIN) The baker(s) won the challenge.
 (HIGH) The baker(s) had one of the best cakes for that challenge, but did not win.
 (IN) The baker(s) advanced to the next week.
 (LOW) The baker(s) was/were a part of the team who lost, but was not the last to move on.
 (LOW) The baker(s) had the worst cake of those who advanced, and was/were the last to move on.
 (OUT) The baker(s) was/were eliminated.
 (WD) The baker(s) voluntarily withdrew from the competition.

Notes

Episodes
 Episode 1: 20 years Of Career Ana María Orozco
 Episode 2: 25 years Of Music With Aleks Syntek
 Episode 3: Birthday Cake
 Episode 4: Day Of The Dead
 Episode 5: Cake Of Real Size
 Episode 6: Final
 Episode Special: Special Mary Christmas

References

2014 Argentine television seasons
2015 Argentine television seasons
Television series by Endemol